This is a list of defunct airlines of Panama.

See also
List of airlines of Panama
List of airports in Panama

References

Airlines, defunct
Panama